Serbinum, also known as Serbitium or Serbicium, was an ancient Roman city in the province of Pannonia. It was situated in the location of present-day Gradiška in northern Bosnia and Herzegovina.

Sources

In Ptolemy’s Geography from the 2nd century, there is mention of (and it is also indicated on a map) a place named Serbinon or Serbinum (This place was located under mountains Biblia ore or Biblini montes or Beby m. which are actually Kozara and Grmeč, according to Hungarian scientists).
In the book Itinerarium Antonini from the 2nd and 3rd centuries, this name is written as Servitium.
In a map known as Tabula Peutingeriana from the 4th century, this name is written as Seruitio.
In the book Notitia Dignitatum from about 400 AD, this name is written as Servitii.
In the book Anonymi Ravennatis Cosmographia from the 7th and 8th centuries, this name is written as Serbitium.

All mentioned forms of the name (including Serbinon, Serbinum, Servitium, Seruitio, Servitii, and Serbitium) refer to a single place, which is identified as present-day Gradiška.

The settlement is primarily believed to have been located on the right bank of the river Savus, but there was also a corresponding settlement on the left bank, near today's Stara Gradiška that some modern-day local sources also identify as Servitium.

History

In Roman times, the Municipium Servicium was an important crossroad between the east and the south of the Balkans, i.e. a port for the Roman river fleet, which speaks for itself about the strategic importance of the settlement at the time.

The city could possibly be named after Serboi, ancient Sarmatian tribe, which perhaps inhabited the Pannonian Plain together with Iazyges.

References

External links
 Map of ancient Pannonia from a 19th-century atlas of the Roman world

Roman towns and cities in Bosnia and Herzegovina
Illyricum (Roman province)
Pannonia Inferior
Populated places in Pannonia